Helmut Artelt (born 7 November 1940) is a German former sports shooter. He competed in the 50 metre pistol event at the 1968 Summer Olympics for East Germany.

References

1940 births
Living people
German male sport shooters
Olympic shooters of East Germany
Shooters at the 1968 Summer Olympics
Sportspeople from Wrocław